Augustin Brassard (July 16, 1922 – December 26, 1971) was a Canadian politician, lawyer, secretary and teacher. He was born in Roberval, Quebec, Canada. He was elected to the House of Commons of Canada in the 1957 election as a Member of the Liberal Party to represent the riding of Lapointe. He was re-elected in the 1958 election and defeated in 1962.

References

1922 births
1971 deaths
Liberal Party of Canada MPs
Members of the House of Commons of Canada from Quebec
People from Roberval, Quebec